Norbert Farkas (born April 7, 1992 in Budapest) is an alpine skier from Hungary. He competed for Hungary at the 2014 Winter Olympics in the slalom and giant slalom. He is 11-time Hungarian National Champion, 28-time Hungarian National Junior Champion. A team member of Felix Promotion sport-management agency. He learned to ski at the age of three. He has been studying International Business at Budapest University of Technology and Economics and was granted "A Good Student, a Good Athlete" award in 2013. Coaches are: Armin Brunner, Budai Balázs and Zakariás Zsolt. His role model is Felix Neureuther.

FIS World Ski Championship participation

Competitive History (Notable results)

2007/2008
Hungarian University Race, Giant Slalom: 47th place (the best Hungarian)
 FIS points at the end of the season:
93.30 point in Slalom – (5th best Hungarian)
93.95 point in Giant Slalom (2nd best Hungarian)
115.21 point in Super Giant Slalom (2nd best Hungarian)

2008/2009
FIS Junior World Ski Championship (Garmisch-Partenkirchen, Slalom: 53rd place, 2nd place in Junior I. category
European Youth Olympic Festival (Szczyrk), Slalom: 34th place (the best Hungarian)
FIS World Ski Championship  (Val d’Isére): qualification races
Hungarian University Race, Giant Slalom : 41st place (2nd best Hungarian)
FIS points at the end of the season:
76.79 point in Slalom (4th best Hungarian)
79.65 point in Giant Slalom (3rd best Hungarian)
123.60 point in Super Giant Slalom (3rd best Hungarian)

2009/2010
 Member of the Hungarian Qualification Team for XXI. Winter Olympic Games (Vancouver)
 FIS Junior World Ski Championship, Slalom: 41st place (the best Hungarian)
 Hungarian National Championship, Giant Slalom: 2 gold medals
 Hungarian University Race, Giant Slalom: 33rd place (the best Hungarian)
FIS points at the end of the season:
62.01 point in Slalom (3rd best Hungarian)
74.20 point in Giant Slalom (the best Hungarian)
88.68 point in Super Giant Slalom (the best Hungarian)

2010/2011
FIS Junior World Ski Championship (Crans Montana), Giant Slalom: 63rd place (the best Hungarian)
FIS World Championship (Garmisch-Partenkirchen), Giant Slalom: qualified as 39th (the best Hungarian); race place: 63rd
Hungarian National Championship, Slalom: gold and silver medals
FIS points at the end of the season:
59.92 point in Slalom (the best Hungarian)
66.19 point in Giant Slalom (the best Hungarian)
99.75 point in Super Giant Slalom (the best Hungarian) 
125.83 point in Super Combination (the best Hungarian)

2011/2012
FIS World Cup (Schladming)
Serbian International Competition (FIS Race ), Giant Slalom: 2nd place
Hungarian National Championship:  1st in Giant Slalom, Slalom and Combination
FIS points at the end of the season:
52.32 point in Slalom (the best Hungarian)
61.78 point in Giant Slalom (the best Hungarian)
97.75 point in Super Giant Slalom (the best Hungarian)

2012/2013
Hungarian National Championship, Slalom: 1st place
Hungarian National Championship, Giant Slalom: 1st place
Junior Hungarian Championship, Slalom: 1st place
Junior Hungarian Championship, Giant Slalom: 1st place
FIS points at the end of the season:
44.74 point in Slalom
49.72 point in Giant Slalom
112.22 point in Super Giant Slalom

XXII Olympic Winter Games (Sochi)
Norbert Farkas represented Hungary on men's alpine skiing events (slalom and giant slalom) at the XXII Olympic Winter Games in Sochi.
 Giant slalom
 BIB: 79
 Run 1 rank: 55
 Run 2 rank: 50
 Final Rank: 50
 Slalom
 BIB: 94
 Run 1 rank: 58
 Run 2 rank: DNF

References

Sources
 Felix Promotion Athlete Profile
 FIS International Ski Fedatation Athlete Profile(biography, results and points)
 Hungarian Ski Association

External links
 Official Facebook Page (Hungarian)
 HAVAZIN Interview on 27 January 2014 (Youtube) (Hungarian)
 Article on Hungarian Wikipedia
 Sochi2014 Profile

1992 births
Living people
Hungarian male alpine skiers
Olympic alpine skiers of Hungary
Alpine skiers at the 2014 Winter Olympics
Skiers from Budapest